is a professional Go player.

Biography 
Satoru Kobayashi is a professional Go player, who plays for the Japanese Nihon Ki-in. His rank is 9 dan, and he is known for his pincer style. He has one brother and sister, who are also professionals - Chizu Kobayashi and Kenji Kobayashi.

Suspension 
In the beginning of 2001, Kobayashi was suspended by the Nihon Ki-in. He had accidentally injured his Chunlan Cup opponent Ryu Shikun while they were drinking at a bar, by gesturing with his hand while it held a brandy glass, breaking the glass, gashing Ryu Shikun's cheek and his own hand. Kobayashi offered to retire from Go, but the Nihon Ki-in set that offer aside. The Chinese and Koreans both pleaded for clemency toward him; the suspension was shortened from a year to 8 months, and Kobayashi was allowed to play in September.

Promotion record

Titles and runners-up

References

1959 births
Japanese Go players
Living people
People from Matsumoto, Nagano